Alice Underwood Fitch (July 5, 1862 – August 1936) was an American painter born in Memphis, Tennessee.

Fitch went to France in 1900 to study and paint. She became especially noted for her work as a miniature painter. For over 20 years, she was in constant demand as a copyist of famous paintings in the Louvre and other French galleries. Many of her original works and copies hang in collections of the most famous collectors of France and Europe; therefore, her works seldom come up for sale.

In 1908, the French Government conferred the Ordre des Palmes Académiques on her. In 1926, she moved to Santa Ana, California with her adopted son. While in Santa Ana, she painted the portrait of Senora De La Rosa, a 128-year-old Mexican lady, who is being researched by the Guinness World Records as the oldest person to ever have lived. The painting of the "Old Senora" is in the collection of Richard M. Othus of Conrad, Montana.

References 

1862 births
1936 deaths
19th-century American painters
20th-century American painters